Michael A. Green (born October 23, 1979) is a Canadian former professional ice hockey player. He is currently a scout for the Vancouver Giants of the Western Hockey League.

Career 
During the 2003–04 season Green played 24 games in the National Hockey League (NHL) with the Florida Panthers and New York Rangers, scoring one goal and three assists, and collecting four penalty minutes.

Green moved to Germany in 2004, signing with the Nürnberg Ice Tigers and then joining the Hannover Scorpions the next season before returning to the United States to play in the American Hockey League with the Iowa Stars. He rejoined the Hannover Scorpions for the 2007–08 season. He last played for the Grizzly Adams Wolfsburg in the 2009–10 season.

Career statistics

Regular season and playoffs

Awards and honours

References

External links

1979 births
Living people
Canadian expatriate ice hockey players in Germany
Canadian ice hockey centres
Cincinnati Mighty Ducks players
Edmonton Ice players
Grizzlys Wolfsburg players
Florida Panthers players
Hannover Scorpions players
Hershey Bears players
Ice hockey people from British Columbia
Iowa Stars players
Knoxville Speed players
Kootenay Ice players
Louisville Panthers players
Macon Whoopee (ECHL) players
New York Rangers players
Nürnberg Ice Tigers players
Port Huron Border Cats players
San Antonio Rampage players
Sportspeople from Victoria, British Columbia
Undrafted National Hockey League players